The second Movement for Democratic Change – Tsvangirai congress was held in Harare on 18 March 2006.

The Congress
According to constitution, the functions and Powers of Congress shall be:
(a) to formulate the policies and principles of the Party;
(b) to supervise the implementation of policies, principles and programmes of the
Party;
(c) subject to clause 5.4, to elect members of the National Council, save for those
members referred to in section 5.4.2 (t) - (v);
(d) to approve the audited financial statements of the Party and appoint or reappoint
auditors;
(e) to repeal or amend the Constitution; and
(f) To dissolve the party in terms of this Constitution.
(g) to review, ratify, modify, alter or rescind any decision taken by any organ or
official of the party;
(h) to condone any reasonable non-compliance with the time limits provided for in
this Constitution, save for the time limits defined in paragraph 5.2.2.

The presidential and vice presidential voting

Morgan Tsvangirai was elected president unanimously, and Hon.Thokozani Khuphe was elected for vice president, replacing Gibson Sibanda.

Tsvangirai acceptance speech
In his acceptance speech Tsvangirai said:

See also 
Movement for Democratic Change
Morgan Tsvangirai
44 Harvest House

References

External links
MDC web site
Zimbabwe Opposition leader and champion of democratic reform speaks at University of Melbourne

History of Harare
Movement for Democratic Change
2006 in Zimbabwe
2006 conferences
21st century in Harare